Doug Block (born 1953 in Port Washington, New York) is an American documentary filmmaker. He is best known for his work on the documentaries 112 Weddings, 51 Birch Street, Home Page, The Kids Grow Up and more.

Life and career
Doug was born in Port Washington, New York and graduated from Cornell University.

Doug's debut documentary film The Heck With Hollywood!, starring Gerry Cook and Jennifer Fox, It screened at American Film Institute and more festivals. In August 1999 he founded (and is currently a co-host of) The D-Word, an online community for documentary professionals worldwide. His second documentary film, Home Page, nominated for the Grand Jury Prize at the Sundance Film Festival.
In 2005, his documentary, 51 Birch Street, was named one of the 10 Best Films of the Year by the New York Times. In 2010, his documentary, The Kids Grow Up, received Special Jury Mention at the Silverdocs.

Doug is currently working on a new documentary, Betty & Henri, which is based on a love letter tucked into the guidebook he'd taken along on an anniversary trip to Paris.

Filmography
112 Weddings (2014) (Director, Producer, Cameraman)
The Children Next Door (2013) (Director, Cameraman)
Resurrect Dead: The Mystery of the Toynbee Tiles (2011) (Executive Producer)
The Kids Grow Up (2010) (Director, Producer, Cameraman)
The Edge of Dreaming (2009) (Producer)
Orgasm Inc. (2009) (Consulting Producer)
A Walk Into The Sea: Danny Williams and the Warhol Factory (2007) (Producer)
51 Birch Street (2005) (Director, Producer, Cameraman)
Paternal Instinct (2004) (Co-Producer)
Love and Diane (2002) (Consulting Producer, Cameraman)
Home Page (1998) (Director, Producer, Cameraman)
A Perfect Candidate (1996) (Cameraman)
Jupiter's Wife by Michel Negroponte (1995) (Co-Producer) 
Silverlake Life: The View from Here (1993) (Co-Producer)
The Heck With Hollywood! (1991) (Director, Producer, Cameraman)

References

External links

Doug Block  51 Birch Street official site 
Doug Block Short biography
The D-Word The D-Word

1953 births
Living people
American film directors
People from Port Washington, New York